Facundo Barceló Viera (born 31 March 1993), known as Facundo Barceló, is a Uruguayan footballer who plays as a forward for chilean club O'Higgins on loan from Emelec. He previously played domestically for Liverpool and El Tanque Sisley.

Life and career
Barceló was born in Florida, Uruguay. He came through the youth system at Montevideo-based club Liverpool, and made his first-team debut on 24 February 2013, aged 19, as a second-half substitute in a 1–0 opening-day defeat against Danubio in the Primera División. He scored his first goal in his fourth appearance, in a 3–3 draw away to Bella Vista, and in the next match, he scored a hat-trick to help his team beat River Plate 4–2. He finished the 2012–13 Clausura with five goals from twelve appearances, which made him the club's joint top scorer (with Paulo Pezzolano).

He scored six goals in the 2013–14 season, which ended in relegation to the Segunda División. After scoring once from five substitute appearances in the first half of the following season, Barceló joined El Tanque Sisley on a six-month loan. He played eleven matches and scored once, in a 4–2 defeat of Atenas on the final day of the 2015 Clausura; the result confirmed that El Tanque Sisley stayed in the Primera and their opponents were relegated.

In his absence, Liverpool had won the 2014–15 Segunda División title and returned to the Primera. Barceló made seven appearances (one start) in the 2015 Apertura, but in January 2016 he was allowed to leave for another Primera team, Juventud de Las Piedras. He made a scoring debut on the opening day of the campaign against Danubio, albeit in a losing cause, when a shot hit the crossbar and he headed home the rebound, scored again the following week with a penalty awarded when he himself was fouled, and finished the season as the club's top scorer with six goals from eleven appearances.

In August 2016, Barceló joined Argentine Primera División club San Martín de San Juan on loan with an option to purchase. He made his debut on 18 September as a second-half substitute in a 1–1 draw with River Plate in the Estadio Monumental, He top-scored (jointly with Emanuel Dening) for San Martín in the 2016–17 Primera División with five goals. Barceló was reported to be a transfer target for Chilean Primera División club O'Higgins in July 2017, but he signed a two-year contract extension with San Martín.

Honours
Liverpool
 Uruguayan Segunda División: 2014–15

Notes

References

External links
 

1993 births
Living people
People from Florida Department
Association football forwards
Uruguayan footballers
Uruguayan expatriate footballers
Liverpool F.C. (Montevideo) players
El Tanque Sisley players
Juventud de Las Piedras players
San Martín de San Juan footballers
Club Atlético Patronato footballers
Atlas F.C. footballers
C.S. Emelec footballers
O'Higgins F.C. footballers
Uruguayan Primera División players
Uruguayan Segunda División players
Argentine Primera División players
Liga MX players
Ecuadorian Serie A players
Chilean Primera División players
Expatriate footballers in Chile
Expatriate footballers in Argentina
Expatriate footballers in Mexico
Expatriate footballers in Ecuador
Uruguayan expatriate sportspeople in Chile
Uruguayan expatriate sportspeople in Argentina
Uruguayan expatriate sportspeople in Mexico
Uruguayan expatriate sportspeople in Ecuador